Grafton High School is a secondary school in Grafton, Wisconsin. It is part of the Grafton School District. The only public high school in Grafton, it has a student enrollment of around 700.

Academics
Grafton High School provides students with educational opportunities such as core subjects, technology education, physical education, and the fine arts. In Jay Mathews' 2005 Challenge Index, GHS ranked 461st out of 1062 in the country.  This was third in the state and first in the conference.  In 2006, GHS was ranked 559th in the country and fifth in the state.

Teacher of the year
In 2009, industrial technology teacher, Carl Hader, was named Wisconsin High School Teacher of the year. As automotive instructor, he has guided GHS students to first-place finishes in several state and national auto repair competitions.

In 2010, Biology, Earth Science, and Anatomy teacher, Fran Grant, was named the state of Wisconsin Biology Teacher of the year.

Sports
Grafton High School participates in the North Shore Conference.

The football team won state championships in 1981 and 1982.
The girls' basketball team made appearances at the state tournament in 1991 and 1993. In 2007, it won its first state championship, beating New London in overtime. The team also went to state in 2008, but lost in the semi-final round in overtime. In 2009 the Grafton girls won the state championship for the second time.
The boys' soccer team made state appearances in 1993, 1998, 1999, 2000, 2006 and 2015 finishing second three times. In 2006, it was runner-up in the state soccer tournament, losing to Xavier High School.
The girls' soccer team won a state championship in 1997 and made state appearances in 2003, 2004, 2008, 2009, 2010, 2011 and 2012.
The Grafton track team won the state Division 2 title in 2000 and took second in 1999 and 2004. They participated in the Penn Relays on the University of Pennsylvania track in 2005, finishing first in their heat in the 4x800 and taking 13th overall. They left the relays ranked in the top 25 nationally.
The girls' swimming team was state runner-up in 2003 and 2008 and state champion in 2004 and 2005, while taking third in 2006. The girls' swimming team was also WIAA Division 2 state champions in 2013 and 2014.
The Grafton Competition Cheerleading team won the state competition 6 years in a row from 2005-2010
The boys’ golf team was state runner-up in 1999 in Division 2 falling to New Richmond.
The boys rugby club won the 2017 Division 2 State Championship.

Notable alumni 
Beau Benzschawel, American football player 
Dave Levenick, American football player
Rich Strenger, American football player
 Daryl Bagley, American professional rugby player, Dallas Jackals

References

External links

 Grafton High School website

Educational institutions established in 1956
Public high schools in Wisconsin
Schools in Ozaukee County, Wisconsin
1956 establishments in Wisconsin